KHOI (89.1 FM) is a community radio station in Story City, Iowa and serving the Ames area. The station primarily broadcasts a mix of music, news and local public affairs programming.  KHOI also is affiliated with the Pacifica Radio network.

As a community station, all local programs are hosted by volunteers. The station's   founder and manager is Ursula Ruedenberg, who oversees Pacifica's affiliate network of around 200 stations.

See also
List of community radio stations in the United States

References

External links
 

HOI
Community radio stations in the United States